Wahn may refer to :

 Wahn (beetle), an insect in the tribe Obriini
 Wahn, Cologne, a borough in Porz, Cologne, Germany 
 Ian Wahn (1916–1999), Canadian politician
 An Islamic term in Arabic meaning weakness or feebleness
 A track by Tangerine Dream from the 1973 album Atem
 A Kulin name for Crow, a trickster in Australian Aboriginal mythology